Salcombe Lifeboat Station is the base for Royal National Lifeboat Institution (RNLI) search and rescue operations at Salcombe, Devon in England. The first lifeboat was stationed in the town in 1869. The Salcombe Lifeboat has twice capsized, in 1916 with the loss of 13 lives, and in 1983 with no loss of life. Since 2008 the station has operated a  all weather boat (ALB) and an  inshore lifeboat (ILB).

History
Salcombe lies near the mouth of the Kingsbridge Estuary. A little to the east is Prawle Point where, on 10 December 1868, thirteen people died in the wreck of the Gossamer. The following year saw the opening of a lifeboat station and slipway at South Sands. This is south of the town, but north of The Bar which makes navigation difficult for boats passing in and out of the estuary. In 1922 the lifeboat was moved to moorings nearer the town. The boathouse was later used as a store.

It was thought that this would allow them to cover larger areas and so Salcombe was closed in 1925. The closure proved ill-advised and so a station was reopened at Salcombe in December 1930, itself equipped with a motor lifeboat. Crew facilities were placed in the Unity Building on the quay. This was refurbished in 1992 and now includes a museum and display area.

In 1993 an ILB was stationed at Salcombe. A boathouse for this was built beside the existing crew facilities. A new pontoon for the moored lifeboat was provided in 1994.

Capsizes

The lifeboat William and Emma was launched on 27 October 1916 to go to the aid of the schooner Western Lass, ashore beyond Prawle Point. By the time the crew of fifteen had rowed to the wreck, the schooner's crew had been rescued to the shore by the coastguard. The lifeboat turned for home but, approaching South Sands, capsized near The Bar. Thirteen of the crew drowned. The station was closed for a short while but reopened with a self-righter lifeboat and a new crew the following year.

The  were not inherently self-righting but, after the capsize of the  Lifeboat in 1970, they were fitted with air bags that could be used to bring them back upright should they capsize. This was put to the test when Baltic Exchange was aiding a dinghy which had overturned in a force 9 gale on 10 April 1983. The lifeboat capsized too, but the air bag automatically inflated. The crew rescued their one-member who was washed overboard and then put into Brixham, the dinghy crew having been winched off by helicopter.

Service awards
The volunteer crews of the RNLI do not expect reward or recognition for their work, but the records include many rescues that have been recognised by letters, certificates and medals from the RNLI management. This list is just some of the most notable.

On 7 December 1939, a few months after the start of World War II, the Samuel and Marie Parkhouse went to the aid of the SS Louis Sheid. This had picked up 62 survivors from the SS Tajandoen which had been torpedoed by Günther Prien's U-47 but was now in trouble herself after hitting rocks near Thurlestone. It took the lifeboat crew two journeys to Hope Cove to land the survivors of the tordepoed ship, but the Louis Sheid'''s own crew eventually got ashore after it ran aground in Bigbury Bay. Coxswain Edwin Distin (a survivor of the 1916 capsize) was awarded the RNLI Silver Medal for his seamanship during this rescue. The rest of the crew were awarded bronze medals.

Four years later Distin was himself awarded a bronze medal when, on 4 December 1943, he rescued eleven people from a salvage craft off Start Point.

On 8 January 1992, the Baltic Exchange II went to help the MV Janet C which was adrift without power near Start Point. The crew managed to get a line across and held the  coaster off the rocks for three hours until a tug was able to take over the tow. Coxswain/Mechanic Frank Smith was awarded a bronze medal for his courage, seamanship and determination during this service.

Description
The main crew facilities are in a three-storey building on the waterfront of Union Street. Next door is a similarly constructed single-storey boathouse for the ILB with its own slipway.

Area of operation

Current fleet
 Tamar ALB 16-09 Baltic Exchange III (Official Number 1289, on station 2008), kept afloat alongside.
 Atlantic 85 ILB B-905 Gladys Hilda Mustoe (on station 2018), launched by hand down a slipway.

Former lifeboats

'ON' is the RNLI's sequential Official Number; 'Op. No.' is the operational number painted onto the boat.

Pulling and sailing lifeboatsList incompleteMotor lifeboats

Inshore lifeboats

See also
 List of RNLI stations

References

Further reading
 Barrett, Roger. The Salcombe Lifeboat Disaster - 27 October 1916''. Salcombe RNLI.

External links
 Official station website
 RNLI station information

Lifeboat stations in Devon
Salcombe